Alexander Mark Titchiner (born 13 June 1991) is a retired Welsh  footballer who last played for Flint Town United, as a striker.

Career
Born in St Asaph, Titchiner began his career at Crewe Alexandra; he turned professional at the start of the 2009–10 season, and joined Chasetown on loan in October 2009. He also spent two loan spells at Colwyn Bay during the 2009–10 season, first joining in January and then in March.

In August 2010 he joined Colwyn Bay after his release from Crewe. In October, he joined Chester on loan for a month.

He joined Witton Albion on loan in January 2011, scoring six goals in eight games. He returned to the team at Colwyn Bay on his return, before making the move to Witton Albion permanent in August. He scored 44 goals in all competitions for Witton during the 2011–12 season. He subsequently moved Fleetwood Town in May 2012, signing a two-year professional contract.

He made his debut for Fleetwood on 4 September 2012 as a substitute in a Football League Trophy match against Rochdale and followed this up with his Football League debut on 8 September as a late substitute in a match against Morecambe.

On 26 October 2012 he joined FC Halifax Town on loan for a month. He made his club debut the following day in a league match against Brackley Town. His time with club saw him score a second half hat-trick in a 4–1 victory over Droylsden. before he was recalled to his parent club prior to the end of his agreed loan period. Titchiner returned to Halifax Town on loan in February 2013. Titchiner scored on his second debut for Halifax, in a 3–3 draw with Histon.

He moved on loan to Chester in July 2013.

On 30 January 2014, Titchiner was released from Fleetwood Town, and later rejoined Witton Albion.

He then played in Wales for Conwy Borough, Rhyl and Flint Town United.

Career statistics

References

1991 births
Living people
Sportspeople from St Asaph
Welsh footballers
Crewe Alexandra F.C. players
Chasetown F.C. players
Colwyn Bay F.C. players
Witton Albion F.C. players
Fleetwood Town F.C. players
FC Halifax Town players
Chester F.C. players
English Football League players
Association football forwards
Conwy Borough F.C. players
Rhyl F.C. players
Flint Town United F.C. players